A fence is a barrier enclosing or bordering a field, yard, etc., usually made of posts and wire or wood, used to prevent entrance, to confine, or to mark a boundary. 

Fence or fences may also refer to:

Entertainment

Music
 Fences (band), an American rock band
Fences (song), a song by Blanche
 "Fence", a song from Everything Everywhere All at Once (soundtrack)
 "Fences", a song on Paramore's 2007 album Riot!
 "Fences", a song by Phoenix from the 2009 album Wolfgang Amadeus Phoenix

Other media
 Fence (magazine), an American literary magazine
 Fences (play), a 1983 Pulitzer Prize-winning play by August Wilson
 Fences (film), a 2016 film adaptation of the play, starring Denzel Washington and Viola Davis, and directed by Washington
 Fence (comic book)
 Slitherlink or Fences, a logic puzzle published by Nikoli

Places 
 Fence, Wisconsin, a town in the United States
 Fence (community), Wisconsin, an unincorporated community in the United States
 Fence, Lancashire, a village in England

Science and technology 
 Fence instruction, a computer operation for enforcing sequel memory operations
 A fence, in cluster computing, isolates malfunctioning nodes. Such process is called Fencing (computing).
 Fences (software), a desktop utility for Windows computers by Stardock
 Fence (mathematics), a partially ordered set formed by an alternating sequence of order relations
 Fence (statistics), value beyond which an observation is considered an outlier
 Air Force Space Surveillance System, a radar system for tracking spacecraft, commonly known as "The Fence".

Other uses 
 Fence (criminal), dealer in the purchase and sale of stolen property
 Fence (finance), a combination of financial instruments used to protect an investor against adverse price movements
 Fence (woodworking), portion of a tool used as a guide
 Chumra (Judaism) or "building a fence around the Torah", a prohibition or obligation in Jewish practice
 Fencing response, an unnatural position of the arms following a concussion.

See also 
 Fence lizard (disambiguation), two species of spiny lizard